Sputnik Nizhny Tagil is an ice hockey team in Nizhny Tagil, Russia. They play in the VHL, the second level of Russian ice hockey. The club was formerly affiliated with Avtomobilist Yekaterinburg.

Achievements
 Pervaya Liga champion: 1970, 1975.

External links
 Official site

1948 establishments in Russia
Ice hockey teams in Russia
Ice hockey clubs established in 1948
Nizhny Tagil
Sport in Sverdlovsk Oblast